Palestine Satellite Channel and its companion radio station, Voice of Palestine (launched 1995) are free-to-air (FTA) general entertainment channels in Arabic. The satellite channel is part of the Palestinian Broadcasting Corporation, which began broadcasting from the Gaza Strip immediately after the government took power under the Oslo Accords in 1994.

The key people of Palestine Satellite Channel were Hesham Mikki and Abdulla Maher Elhamarna.

External links

Publicly funded broadcasters
Television stations in the State of Palestine
Arabic-language television stations
Television channels and stations established in 1999
State media
1999 establishments in the Palestinian territories
Television networks in Palestine